A rotary converter plant is a facility at which rotary converters convert one form of electricity to another form of electricity.  The installed combinations of motors and generators at a plant determine the possible type(s) of conversion.  Such facilities also allow the setting of voltages and frequencies, if appropriate equipment is installed.  Rotary converter plants were commonplace in railway electrification before the invention of mercury arc rectifiers in the 1920s.

At each facility, power from an AC power grid was converted to DC to feed into an overhead line or a third rail of a railway.  Rotary converter plants were also used for coupling power grids of different frequencies and operation modes.  The former Neuhof Substation was an example of the latter.  Former machinery transmitters like the Alexanderson alternator were, strictly speaking, rotary converter plants.

In spite of modern power semiconductor technology, rotary converters are still common for feeding railway systems with AC of a different frequency from that of the main electricity grid.  In Europe, this would typically be for 15 kV AC railway electrification.

References

See also 
 Traction current converter plant
 Rotary converter
 Motor–generator
 Static inverter plant
 Lyon-Moutiers DC transmission scheme

Electric power conversion
Converter stations